Erina Yashima is a German conductor. She is currently Assistant Conductor of the Philadelphia Orchestra.

Yashima was born in Heilbronn, Germany, to Japanese immigrants. She received her first lesson in conducting at the age of 14, while studying under Bernd Goetzke at the Institute for the Early Advancement of the Musically Highly Gifted, a program of the Hanover University of Music, Drama and Media.  She then studied at the Hochschule für Musik "Hanns Eisler" in Berlin.

In February 2016, she became the Sir George Solti Conducting Apprentice at the Chicago Symphony Orchestra, working with music director Riccardo Muti for three seasons before joining the Philadelphia Orchestra in April 2019.

References

External links
Erina Yashima biography at the Philadelphia Orchestra

Living people
Year of birth missing (living people)
21st-century German conductors (music)
Women conductors (music)
Musicians of the Philadelphia Orchestra
Music directors of the Philadelphia Orchestra
German people of Japanese descent
People from Heilbronn
Hochschule für Musik Hanns Eisler Berlin alumni
Hochschule für Musik, Theater und Medien Hannover alumni
German expatriates in the United States